Terror Aboard is a 1933 American pre-Code mystery film directed by Paul Sloane, written by Robert Presnell Sr., Manuel Seff and Harvey F. Thew, and starring John Halliday, Charlie Ruggles, Shirley Grey, Neil Hamilton, Jack La Rue, Verree Teasdale and Stanley Fields. It was released on April 14, 1933, by Paramount Pictures.

Plot

Cast 
John Halliday as Maximilian Kreig
Charlie Ruggles as Blackie Witherspoon 
Shirley Grey as Lili Kingston
Neil Hamilton as James Cowles
Jack La Rue as Gregory Cordoff
Verree Teasdale as Millicent Hazlitt
Stanley Fields as Capt. Swanson
Leila Bennett as Lena Klein
Morgan Wallace as Morton Hazlitt
Thomas E. Jackson as Capt. Derick Alison
William Janney as Edward Wilson
Paul Hurst as Boatswain
Frank Hagney as First Mate
Clarence Wilson as Ship's Doctor
Paul Porcasi as Luigi
Bobby Dunn as Cross-eyed Sailor

References

External links
 

1933 films
American mystery films
1933 mystery films
Paramount Pictures films
American black-and-white films
Films directed by Paul Sloane
1930s English-language films
1930s American films